Ceconomy AG is an international retail company headquartered in Düsseldorf, Germany. Its history goes back to the Metro Group. Ceconomy operates more than 1,000 consumer electronics stores in twelve countries. In addition to MediaMarkt and Saturn, the group owns Deutsche Technikberatung. 32.5% of its sales are generated online.

History 
In March 2016, Metro announced a comprehensive reorganization of its business units. Wholesale and food retailing were to be continued separately from the consumer electronics centers. For Cash & Carry and Real, the company wanted to continue to use the "Metro" name. MediaMarkt and Saturn were henceforth to be managed under the umbrella of "Ceconomy". The reorganization was completed in July 2017. Ceconomy and Metro have since been independent sister companies. Both kept their listing on the stock exchange.

Ceconomy started as a leading European electronics retailer. To build on this position, the company focused on diversifying and internationalizing its activities. Examples include the acquisition of a majority stake in Deutsche Technikberatung and a minority stake in French electronics retailer Fnac Darty.

In response to increased competition in retail, Ceconomy developed closer cooperation with Fnac Darty and M.video, but did not realize those plans. The Fnac Darty affiliation caused conflict with MediaMarkt co-founder Erich Kellerhals. There was a controversy between Ceconomy and Convergenta over the company's strategy and board appointments, which ended in 2020.

The Saturn store in the city center of Hamburg is the largest contiguous electronics store in the world, covering an area of 18,000 square meters over 6 floors.

Operations 
Ceconomy is a stock corporation under German law with its registered office in Düsseldorf. Its shares are traded on the Prime Standard of Deutsche Börse. Ceconomy was part of the MDAX from 2017 to September 2018 and has since been part of the SDAX. The largest shareholders include the investment holding company Haniel, the Meridian Foundation, the telecommunications company Freenet, and the Beisheim family; there are other institutional investors such as pension funds.

The current executive board consists of Karsten Wildberger (CEO) and Florian Wieser (CFO). The supervisory board is headed by Thomas Dannenfeldt.

Businesses 
The core of Ceconomy's business activities is the sale of consumer electronics and the installation and repair of related products. The subsidiaries operate largely independently. Ceconomy is increasingly focusing on linking its stores with online retailing. The omnichannel strategy is seen as the most important building block for further development of the Ceconomy group.

Media-Saturn-Holding (or MediaMarktSaturn Retail Group), headquartered in Ingolstadt, bundles business under the MediaMarkt and Saturn brands. The formerly independent retail chains have been affiliated under company law since 1990. The first MediaMarkt store opened in Munich in 1979, the first Saturn store in 1961 on Cologne's Hansaring.

Deutsche Technikberatung (DTB for short), headquartered in Hürth, Germany, is a service company that supports customers with questions about consumer electronics. This includes not only the installation and configuration of devices but also pre-purchase advice. The technicians work either on-site or via remote maintenance.

Notes and references

External links 
 Official website

Retail companies established in 2017
Companies based in Düsseldorf
Consumer electronics retailers of Germany
Publicly traded companies of Germany
Companies listed on the Frankfurt Stock Exchange